The 2003–04 season was Hartlepool United's 95th year in existence and their first season in Football League Second Division since 1993–94. Along with competing in the Football League Second Division, the club also participated in the FA Cup, League Cup and League Trophy. The season covered the period from 1 July 2003 to 30 June 2004.

Players

Current squad

Transfers

Transfers in

Loans in

Transfers out

Loans out

Competitions

Pre-season friendlies

Football League Second Division

League table

Results summary

Results by matchday

Results

Play-offs

FA Cup

League Cup

League Trophy

References

Hartlepool United F.C. seasons
Hartlepool United